Revenge Is Sweet, and So Are You is an album by the Berkeley, California, punk rock band the Mr. T Experience, released in 1997.

Critical reception
The Washington Post thought that the songs "show plenty of Ramones (and Buzzcocks) influence, both in their simple, speedy melodies and the bratty sense of humor." Phoenix New Times deemed the album "16 tracks of tortured love and loss" and "a more eclectic bunch of songs than on Love Is Dead."

AllMusic wrote: "Judging by the ambivalent commercial reaction to this wonderful slab of plastic, even if the MTX record the Rubber Soul of today's music era, they will nevertheless be ignored."

Track listing

Performers
Dr. Frank - vocals, guitar
Joel Reader - bass
Jim "Jym" Pittman - drums
Joe Goldmark - pedal steel guitar on "Hell of Dumb"
Erik Noyes - piano on "With My Looks and Your Brains"
Kim Shattuck, Susan & Michael Portman, and J.D. & Samantha Smiley - backing vocals on "Love is Dead"
Paige O'Donaghue - backing vocals on "She's Coming (Over Tonight)"

Album information
Recorded and mixed April 1997 at Toast in San Francisco, California, except "I Don't Need You Now" recorded and mixed at Foxhound Sound in Oakland, California
Produced, engineered, and mixed by Kevin Army
Assistant engineers: Robert Shimp, Anne Marie Scott, Jacquire King, and Angela Williams
Mastered by John Golden at John Golden Mastering

References

The Mr. T Experience albums
1997 albums